Colette Roth-Brand (born 5 November 1967 as Colette Brand) is a Swiss freestyle skier and Olympic medalist. She received a bronze medal at the 1998 Winter Olympics in Nagano, in aerials.

She participated at the 1992 Winter Olympics in Albertville, where she finished first in the aerials (demonstration event), and also competed at the 1994 Winter Olympics.

Her son is Noé Roth, who is also a freestyle skier.

References

External links

1967 births
Living people
Swiss female freestyle skiers
Olympic freestyle skiers of Switzerland
Freestyle skiers at the 1994 Winter Olympics
Freestyle skiers at the 1998 Winter Olympics
Olympic bronze medalists for Switzerland
Olympic medalists in freestyle skiing
Medalists at the 1998 Winter Olympics
20th-century Swiss women